Quyujaq (also Romanized as Qūyūjāq; also known as Ghooijagh, Gūyjākh, Kuījakh, Kuydzha, Qayūjākh, Qūījāq, and Qūyjāq) is a village in Mavazekhan-e Sharqi Rural District, Khvajeh District, Heris County, East Azerbaijan Province, Iran. At the 2006 census, its population was 26, in 7 families.

References 

Populated places in Heris County